Shefali Shah is an Indian actress of Hindi films, television and web series, and theatre. She started her career in Gujarati theatre before becoming a leading actress of Indian television and later moving to film work.

Films

Television

Dubbing artist

References

External links

Indian filmographies
Actress filmographies